Teuvo Ensio Aura (28 December 1912, in Ruskeala – 11 January 1999, in Helsinki) was a Finnish politician of the Liberal People's Party. He served as Mayor of Helsinki and interim Prime Minister of Finland twice, in 1970 and 1971–72.

Cabinets
 Aura I Cabinet
 Aura II Cabinet

See also
 Timeline of Helsinki, 1960s-1970s

References
 http://www.rulers.org/indexa5.html

1912 births
1999 deaths
People from Sortavalsky District
People from Viipuri Province (Grand Duchy of Finland)
Finnish Karelian people
National Progressive Party (Finland) politicians
Liberal League (Finland) politicians
Liberals (Finland) politicians
Prime Ministers of Finland
Ministers of Trade and Industry of Finland
Ministers of Justice of Finland
Ministers of the Interior of Finland
Mayors of Helsinki
Finnish bankers